Second VA-45, nicknamed the Blackbirds, was an Attack Squadron of the U.S. Navy. The squadron was established on 1 September 1950. On 13 June 1953, the squadron flew its first combat operation while deployed to Korea aboard . It was disestablished on 1 March 1958. It was the second squadron to be designated VA-45, the first VA-45 was disestablished on 8 June 1950.

Home port assignments
The squadron was assigned to these home ports, effective on the dates shown:
 NAS Jacksonville – 01 Sep 1950
 NAAS Cecil Field – 18 Sep 1950
 NAS Jacksonville – 12 Oct 1952

Aircraft assignment
The squadron first received the following aircraft in the months shown:
 AD-2 Skyraider – Sep 1950
 AD-4 Skyraider – Feb 1952
 AD-6 Skyraider – Jun 1954

See also
 Attack aircraft
 History of the United States Navy
 List of inactive United States Navy aircraft squadrons

References

Attack squadrons of the United States Navy
Wikipedia articles incorporating text from the Dictionary of American Naval Aviation Squadrons